Besserer is a surname. Notable people with the surname include:

 Eugenie Besserer (1868–1934), American actress
 Louis-Théodore Besserer (1785–1861), Canadian businessman, notary, and politician

See also
 Bessemer (disambiguation)
 Besser
 Besserer von Thalfingen